Union Township is an inactive township in Jasper County, in the U.S. state of Missouri.

Union Township was named for the fact it originated by the merging, or union, of territory ceded by neighboring townships.

References

Townships in Missouri
Townships in Jasper County, Missouri